Buloqboshi (also spelled as Bulakbashy) is an urban-type settlement in Andijan Region, Uzbekistan. It is the administrative center of Buloqboshi District. Its population was 32,200 in 2016.

References

Populated places in Andijan Region
Urban-type settlements in Uzbekistan